Mette Bergmann (born November 9, 1962 in Kråkerøy) is a retired discus thrower from Kråkerøy, Norway. Her personal best throw was 69.68 metres, achieved in May 1995 in Florø. This is the current Norwegian record.

She represented the clubs Fredrikstad IF and SK Vidar.

Achievements

Notes

External links
 
 

1962 births
Living people
Norwegian female discus throwers
Athletes (track and field) at the 1992 Summer Olympics
Athletes (track and field) at the 1996 Summer Olympics
Olympic athletes of Norway
European Athletics Championships medalists
Sportspeople from Fredrikstad